Valmiera Marathon is an annual road marathon, held in Valmiera, Latvia. It is also the Latvian championship in marathon.

Winners

Marathon
Key:

Half marathon
Key:

External links
 

Valmiera
Half marathons
Athletics in Latvia
Athletics competitions in Latvia
Marathons in Europe
Autumn events in Latvia